"Do Me with Love" is a song written by John Schweers, and recorded by American country music artist Janie Fricke.  It was released in November 1981 as the second single from her album Sleeping with Your Memory.  The song reached #4 on the Billboard Hot Country Singles chart and #1 on the RPM Country Tracks chart in Canada.

Charts

References

1981 singles
1981 songs
Janie Fricke songs
Song recordings produced by Jim Ed Norman
Columbia Records singles
Songs written by John Schweers